The Yonkers Trot is a harness racing event for three-year-old Standardbred trotters raced at a distance of one mile at Yonkers Raceway in Yonkers, New York. The race was created in 1955 to join the Hambletonian and the Kentucky Futurity to form the new United States Trotting Triple Crown.

Historical race events
Driven by Joe O'Brien, California runner Scott Frost followed up his victory in the Hambletonian Stakes with a win in the 1955 Yonkers Trot inaugural. The colt went on to win the Kentucky Futurity to become the first winner of the Trotting Triple Crown.

In 1967, eight of the thirteen Yonkers Trot runners broke stride helping Harry Pownall, Sr. drive longshot Pomp to victory.

Reminiscent of the day when Ron Turcotte aboard the legendary Thoroughbred Secretariat obliterated the Belmont Park track record by 2 3/5 seconds in winning the 1973 Belmont Stakes, in 1977 Billy Haughton drove Green Speed to a new Yonkers Trot record by the same 2 3/5 seconds margin.

The 2000 Yonkers Trot saw Jacqueline Ingrassia become the first female driver to ever win a leg of a harness racing Triple Crown event when she guided Goalfish to victory.

In 2016, Paula Wellwood became the first female trainer to win not only the Yonkers Trot but the U.S. Trotting Triple Crown with Marion Marauder.

Due to renovations at Yonkers Raceway, the race was hosted by Hawthorne Race Course in Chicago. It was won by Windsong's Legacy who posted the fastest mile in the 34 years that harness racing had been run at the Hawthorne track.

Race locations
1955–2003, & 2006–present: Yonkers Raceway, Yonkers, New York
2004: Hawthorne Race Course (Chicago, Illinois) 
2005: Freehold Raceway (Freehold Borough, New Jersey)

Race distances
From inception in 1955 through 1962, the Yonkers Trot was raced over a distance of 1 1/16 miles (1710 metres).

Records
 Most wins by a driver
 6 – Stanley Dancer (1959, 1965, 1968, 1971, 1972, 1975)

 Most wins by a trainer
 6 – Stanley Dancer (1959, 1965, 1968, 1971, 1972, 1975)

 Stakes record (1 mile)
 1:53 1/5 – Windsong's Legacy (2005 at Hawthorne)
 1:54 1/5 – Archangel (2012 at Yonkers)

 Stakes record (1 1/16 miles)
 2:10 3/5 – Duke Rodney (1961 at Yonkers)

Yonkers Trot winners

References

External links
Yonkers Raceway

 
Harness races in the United States
Harness races for three-year-old trotters
United States Triple Crown of Harness Racing
Recurring sporting events established in 1955
1955 establishments in New York (state)